Kurów is a village in south-eastern Poland, located in the historic province of Lesser Poland, between Puławy and Lublin, on the Kurówka River. It is capital of a separate gmina (municipality) called Gmina Kurów, within Lublin Voivodeship. The village has 2,725 inhabitants.

History

Kurów was probably firstly mentioned in the Gesta principum Polonorum of Gall Anonim as castrum Galli, what is interpreted as the Castle of the Kurowie. The earliest historical mention of Kurów comes from a document issued in 1185, which mentions a church dedicated to Saint Giles already existing in the place. Sometime between 1431 and 1442 the village was granted city rights based on the Magdeburg Law. As a private town, it was the centre for the trade in food from the surrounding area. Several fur and leather factories were also located here. In the 16th century, Kurów was one of the centres of Calvinism, since many of the Polish Brethren settled there. By 1660, most of the inhabitants had converted to Arianism. At that time, Kurów was one of the most important urban centers of Lublin Voivodeship, one of three voivodeships of historic Lesser Poland.

After 1660, the town shares its history with the rest of the region. In 1795, after the third partition of Poland, Kurów was annexed by Austria. In 1809, it became part of the Duchy of Warsaw. In 1815, Kurów became part of the Kingdom of Poland. During the November Uprising, in February 1831, the minor Battle of Kurów took place, when the Polish forces under general Józef Dwernicki defeated a Russian army. In 1870, a few years after the January Uprising, the town finally lost its city charter, which has not yet been regained. Since 1918, Kurów was once more part of Poland.

On September 9, 1939, during the Polish Defensive War, which is the name in Poland for the start of World War II, the town was heavily bombed by the German Luftwaffe. Among the targets destroyed was a civilian hospital (marked with red crosses), where many victims perished. During World War II, Germany set up two slave labour camps in the town. In 1942, a minor ghetto was established. However, most of the Poles imprisoned in Kurów escaped and joined the Polish Home Army units operating from the nearby forests.

Jews in Kurów
About 2,600 Jews lived in Kurów when the Second World War began. The Jewish population of Kurów came to end with the war and the slaughter that ensued. The Germans bombed the synagogue, from the air, they machine gunned the people fleeing the bombing. The Jews attempted to set up their lives to live under the domination of the German regime but there was no way to accommodate it. They were robbed, brutalized, and forced to do slave labor. In June 1941, a ghetto was formed and Jews were forbidden to leave Kurów. In April or May 1942, most of Kurów's Jews were marched to Konskowola, some murdered along the way, then the next day to the train station near Pulawy and forced into trains. They were taken to Sobibor where they were murdered. Just a few of the Kurów Jews managed to survive the selections of the first day in that camp and those Jews were able to help organize and execute the revolt in Sobibor which resulted in the destruction of the camp by the Germans themselves. Though some Christians denounced Jews to the Germans, others helped shelter and save several of Kurów's Jews: Mieczysław Kutnik, Adam Turczyk, Wacław Mańko, and Andrzej and Katarzyna Zarzycki, the latter whom were recognized as Righteous Among the Nations by Yad Vashem after the war. Several Jews of the pre-war Jewish population of 2,600 survived the war. 

Many former Jewish residents of Kurów emigrated to America, Israel, Argentina, France before World War II and other points elsewhere, wherever they could find refuge. There was a Kurów burial society in New York.

Old buildings and places
 St. Michael's Church (built in 1452, refurbished in 1692) with the grave of the Zbąski family and sculptures by Santi Gucci (1587)
 Bell tower (built in the 18th century)
 Gate (built in 1911)
 Rectory (built in 1778–1782)
 Vicar's building and parish school
 World War I Cemetery
 Commune Hall (built in the 19th century)
 Post office (built in the 18th century)
 Thermae (built in the 19th century)
 Some monuments

Transport
The S12 and S17 expressways run through the north of Kurów since 2013, allowing Lublin–Warsaw traffic to bypass the village.

Sport clubs
KKS Garbarnia (football, futsal)
KTS Topspin (table tennis)
Kur-Team (nordic walking)
OSP (fire-fighting sport)

Notable people
 Wojciech Jaruzelski – general, former Polish president (born 1923 in Kurów, died 2014 in Warsaw)
 Czesław Janczarski – poet, writer of fairy tales for children (born 1911 in Hruszwica, died 1971 in Warsaw)
 Klemens Kurowski – Polish nobleman and senator, owner of Kurów (born around 1340, died before 1405)
 Grzegorz Piramowicz – priest in Kurów, writer, philosopher (born 1735 in Lviv, died 1801 in Międzyrzec Podlaski)
 Ignacy Potocki – nobleman, owner of Kurów (born 1750, died 1809 in Vienna)

References

Villages in Puławy County
Lesser Poland
Lublin Governorate
Lublin Voivodeship (1919–1939)
Holocaust locations in Poland